K. P. Rajendran (born 3 November 1954) is an Indian politician, State Executive Member of Communist Party of India, and National Working Committee Member of All India Trade Union Congress (AITUC). He was the Minister for Revenue and Land Reforms in the Left Democratic Front government under V. S. Achuthanandan from 2006-2011. He represented the Kodungallur constituency in Thrissur district in the Kerala Legislative Assembly from 2006 to 2011.

Career
Born on 3 November 1954 to K. P. Prabhakaran and K. R. Karthiyani at Thrissur in Kerala, he studied in (Govt. college, Thrissur) Sri C. Achutha Menon Government College, Thrissur, and Sree Narayana College, Nattika. Rajendran holds a B.A. degree and  LLB degree from Kerala Law Academy Law College, Thiruvananthapuram. Before entering into politics he was a student leader and trade union worker. Rajendran was previously elected to Kerala Legislative Assembly in 1996 and 2001.

See also 
 Kerala Council of Ministers

References

External links

Malayali politicians
Politicians from Thrissur
Living people
1954 births
Communist Party of India politicians from Kerala
Members of the Kerala Legislative Assembly
Trade unionists from Kerala